Oppegård Station is a railway station at Oppegård in Akershus, Norway. Located on the Østfold Line, it is served by the Oslo Commuter Rail line L2 operated by Vy with two hourly services. The station was opened along with the rest of Østfold Line in 1879.

External links
 .

Railway stations in Oppegård
Railway stations on the Østfold Line
Railway stations opened in 1879
1879 establishments in Norway